Anopina albominima is a moth of the family Tortricidae. It is found in Guerrero, Mexico.

References

Moths described in 2000
albominima
Moths of Central America